Notioscopus is a genus of dwarf spiders that was first described by Eugène Louis Simon in 1884.

Species
 it contains three species:
Notioscopus australis Simon, 1894 – South Africa
Notioscopus sarcinatus (O. Pickard-Cambridge, 1873) (type) – Europe, Russia
Notioscopus sibiricus Tanasevitch, 2007 – Russia (mainland, Sakhalin), Mongolia, China

See also
 List of Linyphiidae species (I–P)

References

Araneomorphae genera
Linyphiidae
Spiders of Asia
Spiders of South Africa